The Electoral Reform Society (ERS) is an independent campaigning organisation based in the United Kingdom which promotes electoral reform. It seeks to replace first-past-the-post voting with proportional representation, advocating the single transferable vote. It is the world's oldest operating organisation concerned with political and electoral reform.

Overview

The Electoral Reform Society seeks a "representative democracy fit for the 21st century." The Society advocates the replacement of the first-past-the-post and plurality-at-large voting systems with a proportional voting system, the single transferable vote. First-past-the-post is currently used for elections to the House of Commons and for most local elections in England and Wales, while plurality-at-large is used in multi-member council wards in England and Wales, and was historically used in the multi-member parliamentary constituencies before their abolition. 

It also campaigns for improvements to public elections and representative democracy, and is a regular commentator on all aspects of representation, public participation and democratic governance in the United Kingdom.

History

The ERS was founded in January 1884 as the Proportional Representation Society by the polymath and politician John Lubbock. By the end of the year, the Society had attracted the support of 184 Members of Parliament, split almost equally between Conservatives and Liberals. Other early members included Charles Dodgson (better known as Lewis Carroll), C. P. Scott, editor of The Manchester Guardian and Thomas Hare, inventor of the Single Transferable Vote. The initial aim of the Society was to have proportional representation included in the terms of the Representation of the People Act 1884 and the Redistribution of Seats Act 1885, but, despite a determined campaign of political lobbying, it was unable to do so.

A PRS pamphlet of the 1920s described the organisation's aims thus:
1. to reproduce the opinions of the electors in parliament and other public bodies in their true proportions
2. to secure the majority of electors shall rule and all other considerable minorities shall be heard
3. to give electors a wider freedom in the choice of representation
4. to give representative greater independence by freeing them from the pressure of sectional interests (perhaps party discipline and back-room deals were meant)
5. to ensure to parties representation by their ablest and most trusted members.

Alongside its sister organisation, Proportional Representation Society of Ireland, the Society succeeded in getting STV introduced in local and then national elections in Ireland, and in numerous religious, educational and professional organisations. Following World War II, the Society suffered from financial problems and a lack of public appetite for reform. When Fianna Fáil put to a referendum a proposal to revert to first-past-the-post voting twice (1959 and 1968), the Society, under the leadership of Enid Lakeman, led a successful campaign to keep the STV system in Ireland

In 1973, the STV was introduced in Northern Ireland for elections to local councils and to the new Northern Ireland Assembly, and the Society and its staff were called upon to advise in the programme of education set up by the government to raise public awareness.

Interest in proportional representation revived sharply in Britain after the February 1974 general election. From then on, the Society was able to secure a higher public profile for its campaigns. In 1983, the Society was recognised by the United Nations Economic and Social Council as a Non-governmental organization with Consultative Status.

Activities

The Society has campaigned successfully for the introduction of STV for local elections in Scotland, and led the call for a referendum on the voting system in the wake of the United Kingdom parliamentary expenses scandal as part of the Vote for a Change campaign. It is a founding member of the Votes at 16 Coalition.

AV referendum

The Society was later a principal funder of the YES! To Fairer Votes campaign in the unsuccessful bid for a Yes vote in the 2011 referendum on the Alternative Vote. Its Chief Executive, Katie Ghose, served as the campaign's chair.

Police and crime commissioners

In 2012, the Society criticised Government handling of its policy of elected Police and crime commissioners – which led to the lowest turnout in British peacetime history.

In August 2012, the Society predicted turnout could be as low as 18.5% and outlined steps to salvage the elections, mobilising support from both candidates and voters. The Government did not change tack, dubbing the prediction a "silly season story". Following the result (in which the national turnout was a mere 15.1%, even lower than the Society's prediction), the Society branded the Government's approach to elections as a "comedy of errors", views that were reiterated by Shadow Home Secretary Yvette Cooper.

Voter registration

The Society led bids to change the Government's approach to introduction of Individual Electoral Registration, which the New Statesman dubbed "the biggest political scandal you've never heard of". Electoral Commission sources estimated as many as 10 million voters could disappear from the electoral roll under government plans, predominantly poor, young or black, and more liable to vote Labour. The Society succeeded in securing changes to the legislation.

European Union
In a 2014 report, the society recommended several ways to make the European Union more accountable and argued that there was a democratic deficit.  These included: better scrutiny of EU legislation by the British parliament, a voting system which gives voters more influence over individual candidates (e.g. single transferable vote) and recruitment of party candidates with a wider ranges of views on the EU.

Analysis of 2016 EU referendum
In August 2016, the Society published a highly critical report on the referendum and called for a review of how future events are run. Contrasting it very unfavourably with the 'well-informed grassroots' campaign for Scottish independence, ERS Chief Executive Katie Ghose described it as "dire" with “glaring democratic deficiencies” which left voters bewildered. Katie Ghose noted a generally negative response to establishment figures with 29% of voters saying David Cameron (a Remain supporter) made them more likely to vote leave, whilst only 14% said he made them want to vote remain. Looking ahead, the society called for an official organisation to highlight misleading claims and for Ofcom to define the role that broadcasters are expected to play.

2018 gender analysis 

In February 2018, the ERS reported that hundreds of seats were being effectively 'reserved' by men, holding back women’s representation. Their report states that 170 seats are being held by men first elected in 2005 or before – with few opportunities for women to take those seats or selections.

Labour for a New Democracy 

In September 2020, the Electoral Reform Society joined with other pressure groups (including Labour Campaign for Electoral Reform) and Labour MPs to launch Labour for a New Democracy, a campaign to "build support for UK electoral reform in Labour with the aim of changing party policy by the time its next conference takes place". According to polling, three-quarters of Labour members believe the party should commit to supporting proportional representation and adopt it as a policy. The motion for the 2021 Labour Party conference was defeated despite 80% of CLP delegates voting in favour due to an overwhelming vote against by the affiliated trade unions, most of which at the time did not have policy on electoral reform.

Related organisations 

 Electoral Reform Services Limited (ERS, formerly Electoral Reform Ballot Services): a company established by the Electoral Reform Society in 1988 to provide an independent balloting and polling service to organisations conducting elections and polls. The service is widely used by trade unions, political parties, building societies and companies when balloting their members or shareholders in ways defined by the law and their internal management. In many cases, these organisations are forbidden from conducting their ballots internally in an attempt to ensure that the ballots are conducted impartially. Until 2018 the Electoral Reform Society remained a minority shareholder and was in large part financed by its dividend from Electoral Reform Services. In 2018 Electoral Reform Services was bought by Civica, becoming Civica Election Services. The majority of the Electoral Reform Society's income is now financed by a capital fund set up with the proceeds from this sale.

See also 
Make Votes Matter
Take Back Parliament
Suffragette
Chartism
History of suffrage in the United Kingdom
Electoral reform in the United Kingdom

References

External links
 Official website
 Civia Election Services
 
 Guardian Special Report – Electoral Reform
 UK Parliamentary Archives, Records of the Proportional Representation Society

1884 establishments in the United Kingdom
Electoral reform groups
Electoral reform in the United Kingdom
Organizations established in 1884
Political advocacy groups in the United Kingdom
Political and economic think tanks based in the United Kingdom